Oebisfelde-Weferlingen is a town in the Börde district in Saxony-Anhalt, Germany. It was formed on 1 January 2010 by the merger of the former municipalities Bösdorf, Döhren, Eickendorf, Eschenrode, Etingen, Hödingen, Hörsingen, Kathendorf, Oebisfelde, Rätzlingen, Schwanefeld, Seggerde, Siestedt, Walbeck and Weferlingen. On 1 September 2010 Everingen was also incorporated. These 16 former municipalities are now Ortschaften or municipal divisions of the town Oebisfelde-Weferlingen.

References

 
Börde (district)